The 1925 Iowa State Cyclones football team was an American football team that represented Iowa State College of Agricultural and Mechanic Arts (later renamed Iowa State University) in the Missouri Valley Conference (MVC) during the 1925 college football season. In its fourth and final season under head coach Sam Willaman, the team compiled a 4–3–1 record (3–2–1 against MVC opponents), tied for third place in the conference, and outscored opponents by a total of 107 to 93.

On October 10, 1925, Iowa State dedicated its new football stadium, State Field, in Ames, Iowa. The Cyclones defeated the Kansas Jayhawks by a 20 to 0 score in the dedication game.

Johnny Behm was the team captain. Lincoln Cory was selected as a first-team all-conference player.

Schedule

Roster

References

Iowa State
Iowa State Cyclones football seasons
Iowa State Cyclones football